Rodolfo Valenzuela (20 November 1904 – 6 March 1967) was an Argentine fencer. He competed in the individual and team foil events at the 1932 and 1936 Summer Olympics.

References

1904 births
1967 deaths
Argentine male fencers
Olympic fencers of Argentina
Fencers at the 1932 Summer Olympics
Fencers at the 1936 Summer Olympics
Fencers from Buenos Aires